Anathallis bertoniensis is a species of orchid plant native to Argentina.

References 

bertoniensis
Flora of Argentina
Plants described in 1920